This is a list of contemporary players of the guqin of the 20th and 21st centuries. It attempts to list most notable players (i.e. if they are publicly known and/or have made a significant contribution to qin music).

Table guide
Personal Names (English): Gives name(s) of person in English. If that person was born with a Chinese name, it is listed in Mandarin pinyin. If one has a Cantonese or other Chinese dialect name, the Mandarin pinyin takes priority over it in order listing. The names will be listed in alphabetical order. For the sake of tidiness, the Family name will go first.
Personal Names (Chinese): Given name(s) of the person in traditional full Chinese characters. If that person does not have a Chinese name, it would be marked 'None'. 
Dates: Gives the year of birth and death of said person. If not known, then deceased (dec.) or active (act.) will be used instead. 
School or Base: The person's school or where they are currently active if known. 
Remarks: Any important information about this person, e.g. their occupation, experience, etc.

China, Taiwan and Hong Kong SAR

United States

Canada

Germany

Brazil

Others

See also
Guqin
Guqin societies
Traditional Chinese musical instruments

References

International Directory of Guqin Teachers

Chinese musicians